Piplan (Punjabi), is a small city in Piplan Tehsil in Mianwali District, situated in Punjab, Pakistan. It is almost 52 km (by road) from the district capital Mianwali which lies to the north. Piplan is surrounded by many other similar towns:
To the south are the towns of Musa Wali Mattha, Churkin, Jhanbir and Kaloor Kot, To the north are Doaba, Mianwali, Alluwali, Kundian and Mianwali to the east, Hernoli and Hafiz Wala and to the west is the Indus River.

History
The name of Piplan was given historically before the independence of Pakistan in 1947. Many Hindus used to live in Piplan and the name of this town was Peepul or Peepul wala (Peepul: fig tree, regarded as sacred by both Hindus and Buddhists, who call it a "bo tree"). Later, after the independence of Pakistan in 1947, the name was changed to Peepul-Aan, now written as Piplan. Many people say the tree was located near to the main railway station of Piplan, however, the tree has been cut down.

Sports 

Piplan has always been a hub of sports activities for the surrounding areas. The sports include cricket, volleyball, badminton, tug of war, wrestling, hockey, and football. There used to be annual school based games in which the high schools from the surrounding areas participated.

Education

There are a number of government and private educational institutions in the city:  A degree college each for men and women, three government secondary schools for boys and girls. There are private elementary schools such as The smart School, Allied public school, Dar e Arqam, City school, Al Mumtaz School, Convent missionary school and MK school Danish Public school. In 2017, a school named Jinnah public higher secondary school was established.

Geography
Latitude:32.2867, Longitude:71.3664	
Altitude (feet)	610,(meters)185
Time zone:	UTC+5

Nearby cities and towns

Climate
Piplan (as does the whole district of Mianwali) has extreme weather.  Summer lasts from May to September; June is the hottest month with an average monthly temperature of 42 °C with a maximum of up to 50 °C.  In winter, however, the December and January temperature is as low as a 3 to 4 °C average monthly.

Agriculture
Piplan lies in the irrigated zone of Pakistan. There are two main seasons Rabi (October–March) and Kharif (April–September).

References

 List Of Permanent Closed Mills in Pakistan 1980-1991
 NRB Tehsil Municipal administration

Union councils of Mianwali District
Populated places in Mianwali District